The Men's high jump event  at the 2011 European Athletics Indoor Championships was held at March 4–5, 2011 with the final being held on March 5 at 14:30 local time.

Records

Results

Qualification
Qualification: Qualification Performance 2.30 (Q) or at least 8 best performers advanced to the final. It was held at 16:00.

Final
The final was held at 16:00.

References

High jump at the European Athletics Indoor Championships
2011 European Athletics Indoor Championships